Blossom Alexandra Liliana Tainton-Lindquist (born 29 June 1962 in Stockholm) is a Swedish singer, dancer, publisher, fitness coach and personal trainer.

Her father, Graham Tainton, is a choreographer. Tainton danced and sang at an early age. She attended the Adolf Fredrik's Music School in Stockholm. She featured in musicals and had a very short career as a solo artist. In 2002 she represented Sweden in the Eurovision Song Contest as a member of Afro-dite with the song Never Let It Go, and finished 8th. The group released an album, and the single Never Let It Go stayed in the Swedish chart for 17 weeks, peaking at no 1.

 Blossom Tainton works as a personal trainer, and has released training videos, books and (2010–2011) the monthly publication Blossom Magazine.
She also performs with Afro-dite, as the group still does small tours and occasional concerts.

She has previously hosted her own fitness program, Toppform on SVT as well as being featured in various entertainment television shows such as Jackpotkväll and Så ska det låta among others.

On Christmas Eve 2005 Tainton was the Christmas host on SVT.

Personal life
Her father is South-African born choreographer Graham Tainton, best known for his work with ABBA. He is black and left South Africa due to apartheid.

References

External links
 Blossom Magazine

1962 births
Eurovision Song Contest entrants for Sweden
Eurovision Song Contest entrants of 2002
Swedish pop singers
Living people
Singers from Stockholm
Swedish people of South African descent
Melodifestivalen contestants of 2012
Melodifestivalen contestants of 2003
Melodifestivalen contestants of 2002